The 1999 Polish Speedway season was the 1999 season of motorcycle speedway in Poland.

Individual

Polish Individual Speedway Championship
The 1999 Individual Speedway Polish Championship final was held on 20 August at Bydgoszcz.

Golden Helmet
The 1999 Golden Golden Helmet organised by the Polish Motor Union (PZM) was the 1999 event for the league's leading riders. The final was held at Wrocław on the 18 September.

Pairs

Polish Pairs Speedway Championship
The 1999 Polish Pairs Speedway Championship was the 1999 edition of the Polish Pairs Speedway Championship. The final was held on 18 June at Bydgoszcz.

Junior Championship
 winner - Rafał Okoniewski

Silver Helmet
 winner - Mariusz Franków

Bronze Helmet
 winner - Rafał Okoniewski

Team

Team Speedway Polish Championship
The 1999 Team Speedway Polish Championship was the 1999 edition of the Team Polish Championship. Polonia Piła won the gold medal for the first time in their history. The team included Hans Nielsen, Rafał Dobrucki and Jacek Gollob. 

A new format would be introduced the following year which resulted in three teams being relegated from the First division and seven teams relegated from the Second division.

First Division

Play offs

Second Division

References

Poland Individual
Poland Team
Speedway
1999 in Polish speedway